The Tell Tale Wire is a 1919 American short silent Western film directed by B. Reeves Eason.

Cast
 Hoot Gibson
 Josephine Hill
 Leo Pattee

See also
 Hoot Gibson filmography

External links
 

1919 films
1919 Western (genre) films
1919 short films
American silent short films
American black-and-white films
Films directed by B. Reeves Eason
Silent American Western (genre) films
1910s American films